Indigofera hirsuta, the hairy indigo or  rough hairy indigo, is a species of flowering plant in the family Fabaceae. It is native to nearly all the world's tropics; South America, Africa, Madagascar, the Indian Subcontinent, southern China, southeast Asia, Malesia, Papuasia and Australia, and has been introduced to the Caribbean, the southeast United States, Mexico and Central America. It is used as a green manure and, to a minor extent, for forage.

References

hirsuta
Flora of South America
Flora of Africa
Flora of tropical Asia
Flora of South-Central China
Flora of Southeast China
Flora of Australia
Taxa named by Carl Linnaeus
Plants described in 1753